Hawkenbury is the name of two villages in Kent, England:
 Hawkenbury, Maidstone, near Staplehurst
 Hawkenbury, Tunbridge Wells